eShop Inc. (formerly known as Ink Development Corporation) was an American computer software company founded on May 10, 1991. It was originally founded in San Mateo, California in 1991 to develop products for Go Corporation's PenPoint operating system. In later years, it developed software for the Windows for Pen Computing and Magic Cap platforms.

In 1993, it was renamed to eShop Inc. and developed electronic commerce software, focusing primarily on the "business-to-consumer" marketplace. eShop Inc. launched eShop Plaza on November 7, 1995, which included stores from online merchants.

eShop was acquired by Microsoft on June 11, 1996 for less than $50 million and eShop's technologies were integrated into Microsoft Merchant Server. Pierre Omidyar, one of the founders of eShop, earned over $1 million from the deal and later founded eBay.

References

External links
 "IBM, Microsoft do some power shopping", article on CNET

Software companies established in 1991
Microsoft acquisitions
Defunct software companies of the United States
Software companies disestablished in 1996
1991 establishments in California
1996 disestablishments in California
1996 mergers and acquisitions
Defunct companies based in the San Francisco Bay Area
American companies established in 1991
American companies disestablished in 1996